is a railway station on the Taita Line in the city of Tajimi, Gifu Prefecture, Japan, operated by Central Japan Railway Company (JR Tōkai).

Lines

Station layout
Nemoto Station has one ground-level side platform serving a single bi-directional track. The station is staffed.

Adjacent stations

|-
!colspan=5|JR Central

History
Nemoto Station opened on February 15, 1920 as a station on the Tōnō Railway. It was closed from October 1, 1928 and reopened on December 26, 1952. The station was absorbed into the JR Tōkai network upon the privatization of the Japanese National Railways (JNR) on April 1, 1987.

Passenger statistics
In fiscal 2016, the station was used by an average of 1,262 passengers daily (boarding passengers only).

Surrounding area

 ruins of Nemoto Castle

See also
 List of Railway Stations in Japan

References

External links

Railway stations in Gifu Prefecture
Taita Line
Railway stations in Japan opened in 1918
Stations of Central Japan Railway Company
Tajimi, Gifu